Ginesi is an Italian surname. Notable people with the surname include:

 Edna Ginesi (1902–2000), British artist
 Veriano Ginesi (1907–1989), Italian actor

See also
 Gini (disambiguation)

Italian-language surnames